Mare (in Dutch Pottebackers) is a small volcanic island at the west side of Halmahera island, Indonesia. The 2 × 3 km island is part of the volcanic arc chain of Halmahera volcanoes. Historically, once discovered by the modern Europeans in the late 17th century (and possibly sooner), the Europeans (i.e. Dutch or Spanish), had come to colonize the people and introduce the system of Mercantilism.

See also 

 List of volcanoes in Indonesia

References 

Stratovolcanoes of Indonesia
Mountains of Indonesia
Volcanoes of Halmahera
Islands of the Maluku Islands
Landforms of North Maluku
Holocene stratovolcanoes